Chappell is an English surname. Notable people with the surname include:
 The Chappell family of Australian cricketers:
 Ian Chappell (born 1943), batsman and captain
 Greg Chappell (born 1948), batsman and captain
 Trevor Chappell (born 1952), batsman and bowler
 Christopher Chappell (born 1955), Canadian cricketer
 Christopher Chappell (rugby league) (20th century), rugby league footballer
 Crystal Chappell (born 1965), American soap opera star
 Ellise Chappell (born 1992), English actress
 Eric Chappell (1933–2022), English TV writer
 Ernest Chappell (1903–1983), American broadcaster
 Frederick Chappell (1849–1907), English footballer
 Lisa Chappell (born 1968), New Zealand actress
 Jan Chappell (born 1949), British actress
 Jim Chappell (born 1955), American smooth jazz pianist
 John J. Chappell (1782–1871), U.S. Representative from South Carolina
 Julie Chappell (born 1978), British diplomat and communications specialist
 Katherine Chappell (1985–2015), visual effects editor
Kevin Chappell (born 1986), American professional golfer
 Marisa Chappell, American historian
 Samuel Chappell (1782–1834), co-founder of Chappell & Co.
 Steve Chappell (born 1969/70), American aerospace engineer and mountain climber
 Sydney Chappell (1915–1987), Welsh professional footballer
 Tom Chappell (19th century), British music publisher of Chappell & Co.
 Tom Chappell (born 1943), American business man and manufacturer
 Urso Chappell (born 1967), American graphic designer and world's fair historian
 Warren Chappell (1904–1991), American author, illustrator and book designer
 William Chappell (disambiguation), several people

English-language surnames